Peter de Vaal (born 3 December 1945) is a former South African cricketer who played first-class and List A cricket from 1965 to 1993. He was an all-rounder who batted in the middle order and bowled left-arm orthodox spin.

Cricket career
Peter de Vaal was a regular player for Transvaal B in 1967–68 and 1968–69, and progressed to the senior Transvaal side in 1969–70. He remained there until 1978–79, then played two seasons with Northern Transvaal. He never played for South Africa, but was picked on the squad for the 1971–72 tour of Australia which was cancelled.

After ten seasons out of the first-class game, and at the age of 45, he returned in 1991–92 to captain the new Eastern Transvaal team in their first two seasons. Under his inspirational leadership they won the UCB Bowl in 1991–92, when de Vaal was the competition's most successful bowler, with 29 wickets at an average of 20.34. He was especially successful in the innings victory over Western Transvaal, when he made 100 not out and took 3 for 32 and 7 for 94.

He spent many years studying accounting at the University of the Witwatersrand. Between 1965 and 1975 he played seven first-class matches for South African Universities.

References

External links
Peter de Vaal at Cricinfo
Peter de Vaal at CricketArchive

1945 births
Living people
University of the Witwatersrand alumni
South African cricketers
South African Universities cricketers
Northerns cricketers
Easterns cricketers
Gauteng cricketers